Erhard Krack (9 January 1931 – 13 December 2000) was a German politician and mayor of East Berlin from 1974 to 1990.

Born in Danzig, he was a member of the Socialist Unity Party (SED). He was also a deputy in the Volkskammer and a member of the Central Committee of the SED.

1931 births
2000 deaths
Politicians from Gdańsk
Socialist Unity Party of Germany politicians
Mayors of East Berlin
Naturalized citizens of Germany
People from the Free City of Danzig